The 2008–09 Saudi Crown Prince Cup was the 34th season of the Saudi Crown Prince Cup since its establishment in 1957. This season's competition featured a total of 16 teams, 12 teams from the Pro League, and 4 teams from the Qualifying Rounds.

Pro League side Al-Hilal were the defending champions and successfully defended their title after a 1–0 win against Al-Shabab in the final. Al-Hilal won their eighth title to become the most successful team in the competition.

Qualifying rounds
All of the competing teams that are not members of the Pro League competed in the qualifying rounds to secure one of 4 available places in the Round of 16. First Division sides Al-Fateh, Al-Riyadh and Al-Ansar qualified as well as Second Division side Al-Fayha.

First round
The first round matches were played on 13 November 2008.

Second round
The second round matches were played on 27 & 28 November 2008.

Final Round
The Final Round matches were played on 2 December 2008.

Bracket

Note:     H: Home team,   A: Away team

Round of 16
The Round of 16 fixtures were played on 13, 14 and 15 February 2009. All times are local, AST (UTC+3).

Quarter-finals
The Quarter-finals fixtures were played on 18 and 19 February 2009. All times are local, AST (UTC+3).

Semi-finals
The Semi-finals fixtures were played on 22 and 23 February 2009. All times are local, AST (UTC+3).

Final
The final was held on 27 February 2009 in the King Fahd International Stadium in Riyadh. All times are local, AST (UTC+3).

Winner

Top goalscorers
As of 27 February 2009

See also
 2008–09 Saudi Professional League
 2009 King Cup of Champions

References

External links
 Crown Prince Cup 2008/09 History at RSSSF

Saudi Crown Prince Cup seasons
2008–09 domestic association football cups
Crown Prince Cup